Smiley Versus Karla (1982), by John le Carré, originally published as The Quest for Karla,  is an omnibus edition of three novels concerning George Smiley's fight against Karla, his counterpart in Moscow Centre (the Soviet KGB). The "Karla Trilogy" includes:

 Tinker Tailor Soldier Spy – (1974)
 The Honourable Schoolboy – (1977)
 Smiley's People – (1979)

See also
 The Incongruous Spy

Novels by John le Carré
1982 British novels
British spy novels
Alfred A. Knopf books